RUFC may refer to:
 A rugby union football club (see also :Category:Rugby union teams)

Association football teams

England 
 Ramsbottom United F.C.
 Retford United F.C.
 Rochester United F.C.
 Rossendale United F.C., dissolved
 Rotherham United F.C., in the English football league

Elsewhere 
 Rakhine United F.C., Myanmar
 Risca United F.C., Wales